The Ybor City Historic District is a U.S. National Historic Landmark District (designated as such on December 14, 1990) located in Tampa, Florida. The district is bounded by 6th Avenue, 13th Street, 10th Avenue and 22nd Street, East Broadway between 13th and 22nd Streets. Ybor City contains a total of 956 historic buildings, including an unparalleled collection of architecture with Spanish-Cuban influence, as well as historic cigar factory buildings and associated infrastructure.  The area was developed by businessman Vicente Martinez Ybor beginning in 1886, and was for a time the world's leading supplier of cigars.

The Ybor City Museum State Park is located in the former Ferlita Bakery building (originally La Joven Francesca) building on 9th Avenue. Tours of the gardens and the "casitas" (small homes of cigar company workers) are provided by a ranger. Exhibits, period photos and a video cover the founding of Ybor City and the cigar making industry.

The Latino Barrio Commission, a city of Tampa-sanctioned committee of neighborhood community and business leaders, architects, and local residents, is charged with "preserving the historic fabric of the District and maintaining its architectural integrity."

District boundaries
The original Ybor City development covers an area roughly bounded on the north by 21st Avenue, the east by 22nd Street, the west by Nebraska Avenue, and the south by Adamo Drive. In 1974, an area centered on Ybor City's 7th Avenue business district was listed on the National Register of Historic Places. The landmark district designated in 1990 substantially enlarged this to include much of the surviving architecture of the development.

Gallery

See also
List of National Historic Landmarks in Florida
National Register of Historic Places listings in Tampa, Florida

Notes

External links

Burgert Brothers Ybor Collection An interactive map of Ybor City where historic photos were taken by the Burgert Brothers.
Ybor City Development Corporation
Map of Ybor City Historic District

Spanish-American culture in Tampa, Florida
National Historic Landmarks in Florida
Cuban-American culture in Tampa, Florida
Historic districts on the National Register of Historic Places in Florida
National Register of Historic Places in Tampa, Florida
Historic American Buildings Survey in Florida
Tobacco buildings in the United States